Sociedade União 1º Dezembro is a sports club from Sintra, Portugal. The football section of the club was founded on 6 April 1938, the women's football section in 1995. The men's football team plays in the Campeonato de Portugal. The women's football team plays in the national top league, the Campeonato Nacional and have dominated till the second decade of XXI century. After the first championship title in 1999–2000, the team won every season from the 2001–02 season onwards for eleven championships in a row. With their twelfth title in 2012 they are Portugal's record champion. In the end of 2013–2014, the women football team ended due to economic issues.

In the UEFA Women's Cup they have not gone past the 1st qualification round. In the 2009–10 and 2010–11 Women's Champions League they competed in the qualifying round.

Current squad

Titles 
 Portuguese women's champion (12): 2000, 2002 to 2012
 Portuguese Women's Cup (7): 2004, 2006 to 2008, 2010 to 2012

Record in UEFA competitions

References

External links 
 
 

Football clubs in Portugal
Sports clubs established in 1880
Association football clubs established in 1938
1880 establishments in Portugal